Kurt Felix may refer to:

 Kurt Felix (television presenter) (1941–2012), Swiss television presenter and entertainer
 Kurt Felix (athlete) (born 1988), Grenadian decathlete